Olo n:o 22 is an outdoor sculpture in Hietalahti, Helsinki, Finland. It was created by Pasi Karjula and Marko Vuokola and unveiled on July 25, 2000.

The sculpture consists of over 50 polished steel spheres of various sizes, scattered in various places around near the seashore. Most of the spheres are out in the open, but some are located inside private businesses or courtyards.

External links
 Olo n:o 22 at the Helsinki Art Museum site

Statues and sculptures in Helsinki
Steel sculptures in Finland
2000 sculptures
Outdoor sculptures in Finland
2000 establishments in Finland